Sergey Ivanovich Ognev (17 November 1886 in Moscow – 20 December 1951 in Moscow) was a scientist, zoologist and naturalist, remembered for his work on mammalogy. He graduated from Moscow University in 1910, the same year in which he published his first monograph. In 1928, he became a professor at the Moscow State Pedagogical University. He published a variety of textbooks in zoology and ecology.  His magnum opus, Mammals of Russia and adjacent territories, was never completed.

References

1886 births
1951 deaths
Zoologists from the Russian Empire
Soviet zoologists
Scientists from Moscow
Academic staff of Moscow State University